¿Dónde Bailarán Las Niñas? is the fourth album of Mexican singer and actress Ximena Sariñana.

History 

Track listing

References

External links 
 Ximena Sariñana - Official website of the singer (in Spanish)

2019 albums
Ximena Sariñana albums
Spanish-language albums
Warner Music Mexico albums